For John Waterman of Rhode Island see John R. Waterman House

John M. Waterman (born May 13, 1952) is an American politician and law enforcement officer who served as a member of the Indiana Senate from 1994 to 2014. Elected to represent the 39th district in 1995, Waterman served in the chamber until being defeated for the Republican nomination for the 39th senate district by Eric Bassler in 2014.

Waterman previously served as Sheriff of Sullivan County, Indiana from 1986 to 1994. He replaced Byron Thrasher who was appointed in October 1986. He ran for Sullivan County commissioner in 2016.

References

External links
State Senator John Waterman official Indiana State Legislature site
 

1952 births
Indiana sheriffs
Republican Party Indiana state senators
Living people